Joseph Whitaker (29 March 1789 – 30 November 1870) was a noted American industrialist, landowner, and legislator in the Phoenixville and Mont Clare area of Pennsylvania, during the 19th century. He was a member of the Whitaker iron family.

Until 1846, Whitaker was the ironmaster and an owner of the Phoenix Iron Works, the major industry in Phoenixville.  He was elected by the Whigs to the Pennsylvania Assembly in 1843, where he served one term.  He was responsible for having the first Mont Clare Bridge constructed in 1844.  His 1846 estate was named Mont Clare, and eventually lent its name to the village of Mont Clare.

In 1836 Joseph, his brother George Price Whitaker, and some partners purchased the Principio Furnace in Maryland and revived ironmaking there. Before the Civil War the Whitakers divided their holdings geographically, with Joseph receiving the Pennsylvania properties and George Price the Maryland and Virginia ones. George Price Whitaker and his descendants continued to be involved in the iron and steel business; their holdings eventually became part of the Wheeling Steel Company in 1921, later Wheeling-Pittsburgh Steel.

Family 
Joseph married Grace Adams (1789–1870) of Swedesboro, New Jersey on 28 April 1811.  They had a daughter, Anna Maria, who married Isaac A. Pennypacker in 1839.  Anna and Isaac's eldest son was Samuel Whitaker Pennypacker; a judge, historian, and the first 20th century Governor of Pennsylvania.  When Isaac died in 1856, Anna and her children, including Samuel, came back to live in Mont Clare with Joseph.

Joseph is the great great great grandfather of American filmmaker, actor, writer, and artist John Waters (born April 22, 1946).

References 

 

American industrialists
Pennsylvania Whigs
19th-century American politicians
Businesspeople from Pennsylvania
1789 births
1870 deaths
19th-century American businesspeople
Whitaker iron family